The Teaching-Family Model (TFM) is a model of care for persons in need of services and care necessary to support an improved quality of life and increase opportunities to live to their potential. The TFM is used internationally in residential homes, foster care, schools, home-based treatment, emergency shelters, assessment centers, and other youth and dependent adult care programs. It was developed in the 1960s through research at the University of Kansas. Researchers included Montrose Wolf (the inventor of time-out as a learning tool to shape behavior) and Gary Timbers. The model has been replicated over 800 times, although not all of the replications have proven effective and successful.

Overview
This model of care is based on an "organized approach to providing humane, effective, trauma-informed, and individualized services that are satisfactory to clients and consumers. It is cost effective and replicable." (from Teaching-Family Association Website) The focus is using scientifically proven methods of behaviorism known as applied behavior analysis to teach and reinforce pro-social, lifestyle skills and allow the individual to maintain or advance in his or her environment. The Teaching-Family Association (TFA) accredits programs and certifies staff implementing the program with fidelity meaning that they undergo rigorous development and training, on-site reviews by qualified peer reviewers, submit consumer satisfaction surveys, and successfully demonstrate implementation of the TFM's 15 Standards with fidelity and as intended.

The TFM is implemented internationally and TFA Accreditation is a registered trademark. Many programs across the U.S. use this model of care, including Accredited sites such as Garfield Park Academy, Thornwell Home for Children, Kenosha Human Development Services, Inc., The Children's Home of Cincinnati, Virginia Home for Boys and Girls, The Barium Springs Home For Children, Closer To Home Calgary, Alberta, Canada, The Indiana United Methodist Children's Home, and Utah Youth Village. Sites are qualified as Accredited Agencies (Sponsor Agencies), Developing Agencies, or Supportive sites. Developing agencies undergo extensive training, consultation, and evaluation by an Accredited Sponsor Agency before applying to become an Accredited Agency. Supportive agencies are not accredited. They recognize the Teaching Family Modality, accept the Standards of Ethical Conduct required by the Association, and meet other requirements necessary to be eligible as a Supportive site.     

The Teaching-Family Association (TFA) is an international organization founded in 1975 to promote this model of care.

Research
Many years of research exist on the Teaching-Family Model. In general, research supports the use of Teaching-Family Homes to reducing recidivism while in the program and some suggest that it reduces post-programming. The Teaching-Family Model has been suggested as a model program for residential treatment facility and behavior modification facility. Studies also demonstrate that the Teaching-Family Model is more cost-effective and beneficial than other programs.

See also
 Behavior modification facility

References

Resources 
 Teaching-Family Association
 Closer To Home Calgary, Alberta, Canada

Family
Caregiving
Behaviorism